The West Salt Creek landslide (also known as the Grand Mesa landslide or West Salt Creek rock avalanche) occurred on the evening of May 25, 2014 near Collbran, Colorado, along the north side of the Grand Mesa, about  east of Grand Junction. It was the largest landslide in Colorado's history.

Background
Via Plateau Creek, it is a tributary of the Colorado River. The valley of West Salt Creek was used mainly for cattle ranching and was mostly private property owned by the Hawkins family. However, the area where the slide originated was located on public land in the Grand Mesa National Forest.

The landslide was caused by a mass wasting event in the Green River Formation, which is composed mainly of loose sedimentary rock, namely shale. The U.S. Geological Survey (USGS) determined that the event occurred on the site of an ancient landslide dating back to the late Pleistocene or early Holocene, at least 11,700 years ago.

Initial landslide
Unseasonably heavy rains during May 23–24 melted the local snowpack and saturated the ground to the point of instability. A small landslide was recorded at approximately 7:18 AM on May 25, and minor slope movement was noticed throughout the day. At 5:44 PM on May 25 a large chunk of the West Salt Creek valley headwall (known as the "slump block") collapsed catastrophically. The initial collapse triggered a wave of subsequent rock failures (a "rock avalanche") that moved  down the valley of West Salt Creek, burying almost  of land under 38 million yd3 (29 million m3) of debris. The speed of the slide was likely increased by a layer of liquefied material underneath the main rock avalanche. Residents described the sound of the landslide as “a low flying, large military helicopter”, "a very long clap of thunder", or “a freight train coming”.

The landslide generated a Mw 2.8 earthquake, destroyed irrigation works and threatened active gas wells in the area, but did not reach Collbran, about  further downstream from the toe of the slide. Although the initial slide lasted only about three minutes, a second debris flow occurred on top of the initial slide, followed by a further collapse of the downslope face of the slide. Smaller landslides and slope failures continued for several weeks after the disaster, bringing the total volume of collapsed material to 71.2 million yd3 (54.5 million m3). This makes it much larger than the Oso landslide which occurred two months previously in northern Washington.

Dispatchers in Grand Junction received the first reports of the landslide around 6:15 PM, and the Plateau Valley Fire Department was called into the area. Three people – Wes Hawkins, Clancy Nichols and Danny Nichols – were reported missing after heading into the area to investigate an irrigation ditch, whose flow had been disrupted by the first landslide at 7:18 AM. Local authorities were joined by experts from the USGS and National Weather Service in the search for the missing men; over 40 people were involved in the search. The search was called off the next day due to dangerous and unstable conditions in the area. The bodies were never found and the three men are presumed killed.

Aftermath
Immediately after the landslide, geologists installed monitoring equipment and conducted an emergency hazard assessment for the area. Because the slide occurred mostly on private property, access for investigation and media coverage was limited; the U.S. Forest Service established a  restriction area around the upper part of the slide where it originated in the Grand Mesa National Forest. There was speculation that fracking in the area could have led to the slide due to impact on seismic activity. However, the closest gas well was located  lower than where the slide originated, and was drilled into a separate geological formation (the Wasatch Formation), and experts concluded that the slide occurred due to natural causes.

Rotation of the slump block dammed the upper part of West Salt Creek, backing up about 120 million gallons (444,000 m3) of water in a temporary lake, threatening downstream communities and landowners. Authorities discussed whether to artificially breach or lower the pond level, but due to the remoteness of the area and its instability, no such work was performed. On May 27, 2016, slightly more than two years after the slide, the pond partially breached, sending a surge of water down West Salt Creek into Plateau Creek; however, the flooding only caused minor damage.

Although the pond has partially drained, the large tilted slump block with a volume of about 65 million yd3 (50 million m3) remains poised at the top of the escarpment, leaning at about 15 degrees; this combined with pressure from groundwater flow poses "a long-term threat for additional slope instability". In addition, the USGS continues to monitor impounded water levels at the dammed pond.

See also
List of landslides

References

W
W
W